Glacier is a Bessie Awards-nominated dance work  by contemporary choreographer Liz Gerring.

References

External links
 Glacier 12-minute excerpt at Vimeo

Dance in New York City